Chirag (Hindi: चिराग; English: Light) is a 1969 Indian Bollywood film directed by Raj Khosla. The film stars Sunil Dutt and Asha Parekh in lead roles. Apart from other plus points, it has the famous song "Teri Aankhon Ke Siwa" sung separately by Mohd. Rafi and Lata Mangeshkar. It also has "Mere Bichhade Sathi Sunta Ja" and "Chhayi Barakha Bahar.." both sung by Lata Mangeshkar.

Plot
Ajay Singh (Sunil Dutt) meets Asha Chibber (Asha Parekh), and is led to believe that she belongs to a wealthy family. After a few misunderstandings, he does find out that she is a simple girl living a poor lifestyle. Both do fall in love, and Ajay goes to meet with Asha's brother, Dr. O.P. Chibber (Om Prakash), and his wife, Shanti (Sulochana Latkar). They are pleased to meet him, and Ajay's mother, Gayetridevi (Lalita Pawar) visits them and approves of Asha. Ajay and Asha get married and settle down. After marriage Asha is expected to conceive, but she is unable to do so. After a certain incident she also loses her eyesight and becomes dependent on Ajay. Frustrated Gayetridevi decides to ask Asha to leave the house, and arranges a second marriage for Ajay, an act which will change the lives of everyone in the house.

Cast
 Sunil Dutt as Ajay Singh
 Asha Parekh as Asha Chibber
 Om Prakash as Dr. O.P. Chibber
 Kanhaiyalal as Singh's employee
 Mukri as Tingu
 Sulochana Latkar as Shanti Chibber (as Sulochana)
 Dulari as Malinya
 Lalita Pawar as Gayetridevi Singh

Awards
Nominated, Filmfare Best Actress Award - Asha Parekh

Soundtrack

The soundtrack of the film contains 7 songs. The music for all the songs were composed by Madan Mohan and the lyrics were penned by Majrooh Sultanpuri. Raj Khosla wanted Majrooh to use the line from faiz's poetry for the song "Teri Aankhon Ke Siwa Duniya", for which permission was obtained.

References

External links

1969 films
1960s Hindi-language films
Films scored by Madan Mohan
Films directed by Raj Khosla